Damon Scott Tweedy is an American physician who is an associate professor of psychiatry and behavioral sciences at the Duke University School of Medicine. In 2015 Tweedy published his memoir, Black Man in a White Coat: A Doctor's Reflections on Race and Medicine.

Early life and education 
Tweedy was born into a socially conservative family. He was an undergraduate student at the University of Maryland, Baltimore County where he played UMBC Retrievers men's basketball. Tweedy was a student at the Duke University School of Medicine in the mid-1990s, and experienced racism as commonplace in society and medicine. As a medical student, Tweedy was mistaken by a professor for a caretaker. He has said that he was worried that he was a product of affirmative action. In 2000 he graduated from Duke University. After graduating in medicine, Tweedy moved to Yale University, where he studied law.

Research and career 
Tweedy was appointed associate professor of psychiatry at the Duke University. He has argued that to address racial inequalities in healthcare, America needs more African American doctors. He attributes the inequity in outcomes to mistrust of African-American people in their majority white doctors, and the mistrust of physicians in their African-American patients. This influences the demographics of patients who take part in clinical studies, which lessens the impact of medical research. He has investigated the history of segregation at Duke University.

Book
In 2015 Tweedy published his memoir, Black Man in a White Coat: A Doctor's Reflections on Race and Medicine, which explores race and its interactions with medicine. The book was well received by critics. The British Medical Journal admired "Tweedy's unflinching honesty and fierce introspection." Black Man in a White Coat was selected as one of the Top 10 Nonfiction Books by Time magazine. It was also recommended reading by Oprah's Book Club and Entertainment Weekly.

Selected publications

References 

Living people
Year of birth missing (living people)
UMBC Retrievers men's basketball players
University of Maryland, Baltimore County alumni
Duke University School of Medicine faculty
Duke University School of Medicine alumni
Yale Law School alumni